Fernando Cuéllar may refer to:

 Fernando Cuéllar (footballer) (1945–2008), Peruvian footballer and football manager
 Fernando Cuéllar Reyes (born 1963), Mexican politician